Cargo Air Ltd, branded as cargoair, is a Bulgarian cargo airline headquartered in Sofia, Bulgaria. The company operates charter flights throughout Europe and the Middle East. The airline's main bases are Leipzig/Halle Airport and Sofia Airport.

History
Cargoair was established on 4 July 1997 as Vega Airlines and was rebranded as Cargoair on 26 October 2006.
In November 2007, Cargo Air was established as a General Sales Agent representative of the Belarusian cargo airline Ruby Star, offering to its customers logistics services with Antonov An-12 and Ilyushin Il-76 aircraft. The same year Cargoair also purchased a Boeing 737-300F. 

From July 2009 Cargo Air began operations for TNT Airways on its European network. In September 2009 Cargoair purchased a second Boeing 737-300F. 

Due to increasing demand for long term aircraft lease operations and ad-hoc charters, the company management decided to purchase a third Boeing 737-300F, delivered in September 2011. 

In February 2013 the company purchased a passenger Boeing 737-400; its conversion to freighter configuration was completed in July 2013. On 15 July 2013 the Boeing 737-400F began commercial service for European Air Transport. In November 2013 Cargoair add second Boeing 737-400F in their fleet. 

In July 2015 Cargo Air added third Boeing 737-400F also operated for European Air Transport. In January 2016 Cargoair added fourth Boeing 737-400. In February 2016 the airline purchased two Boeing 737-800BCF. 

In November and December 2016 the airline added two more Boeing 737-400F to their fleet. In summer 2017 Cargo Air started passenger/ACMI flights on behalf of Air Mediterranean and Travel Service.

Fleet

As of March 2023, the Cargo Air fleet consists of the following aircraft:

References

External links

Airlines of Bulgaria
Airlines established in 2007
Cargo airlines
Bulgarian companies established in 2007